DesktopBSD is a Unix-derived, desktop-oriented operating system based on FreeBSD. Its goal was to combine the stability of FreeBSD with the ease-of-use of K Desktop Environment 3, which is the default graphical user interface.

History and development 
DesktopBSD is essentially a customized installation of FreeBSD and is not a fork of it. DesktopBSD was always based on FreeBSD's latest stable branch but incorporated certain customized, pre-installed software such as KDE and DesktopBSD utilities and configuration files.

A common misconception about DesktopBSD was that it was intended as a rival to TrueOS as a BSD-based desktop distribution, since they were similar in structure and goals. However, DesktopBSD was started approximately one year before the PC-BSD project, despite the fact that the first PC-BSD release came out before DesktopBSD's. Neither project intended to rival the other and they were completely independent with distinctive features and intended outcomes: for example, DesktopBSD uses ports and packages for additional software installation, whereas PC-BSD introduced PBIs.

The final release was 1.7 which was made available on 7 September 2009. The release announcement stated "This is the last and final release of the DesktopBSD project" because the lead developer could no longer contribute the time required to maintain it.
In May 2010 DesktopBSD was restarted under new leadership
though development and announcements stopped soon afterwards. On 10 March 2013, a forum post appeared announcing that the project was "in the process of being revived."  The roadmap for DesktopBSD 2.0 was announced in September 2015 on the DesktopBSD site, along with posted screenshots of a GNOME3-based desktop.

Graphical features 
 Installer allowing to partition disks and create users
 Tool for managing, installing and updating software using FreeBSD ports system
 Management of network interfaces and mounting/unmounting drives

1.7 release 
The 1.7 release includes
 FreeBSD 7.2 as base system
 OpenOffice.org 3.1.1 as feature-rich office suite
 Pre-installed Java SE 6 environment
 X.Org release 7.4 with extensive graphics support
 Large number of enhancements, fixes and minor software updates
 Supports GRUB bootloader on i386 and includes a graphical configuration tool

On 7 September 2009 DesktopBSD 1.7 was made available on the project site.

See also 

 Comparison of BSD operating systems
 FreeBSD
 MidnightBSD
 PC-BSD
 GhostBSD

References

External links
 
 BSDTalk Interview with Peter Hofer (DesktopBSD developer/mp3)
 DesktopBSD flyer Info from AllBSD.de (pdf/English)
 

FreeBSD
KDE
Discontinued operating systems